Riverdale is a historic home located near Odessa, New Castle County, Delaware.  It was built about 1840, and consists of the four-bay-wide, single-room-deep rectangular core of the house with a 22-foot, two-story "L"-shaped extension.  Both sections have gable roofs. Also on the property is the site of a number of demolished outbuildings.

It was listed on the National Register of Historic Places in 1985.

References

Houses on the National Register of Historic Places in Delaware
Houses completed in 1840
Houses in New Castle County, Delaware
National Register of Historic Places in New Castle County, Delaware